The Prince Albert Challenge Cup is an event at Henley Royal Regatta. It is contested by Men's Student Crews in Coxed fours. It has been held since 2004.

Creation in 2004 
The Britannia Challenge Cup was originally presented in 1969 as an event for four-oars with coxswain (Coxed Fours) open to club and student crews, and was contested for its first 35 years by an entry of 32 crews, racing over 5 days - with many times its entry number entering qualification and pre-qualifying races.

The Britannia Challenge Cup was split between club and student crews in 2004, having created additional competition time by removing the Prince Philip Challenge Cup, which had been contested by a small entry (usually between 2–4) of international elite oarsmen but was removed from the racing programme in line with the continued removal of coxed fours racing from international regattas meaning that it had lost value.

The Britannia Challenge Cup remained as the club coxed fours' competition, while the Prince Albert Challenge Cup for men's student coxed fours created in a similar mould, but with entry restricted to:
Universities
Colleges
Schools

No composite crews are allowed to enter. The entry for each competition was set at 16 for both cups. There are now coxed fours events for both clubs and universities at the regatta, and both events have been heavily contested since the change meaning qualifying races have been held for the events. The Prince Albert has attracted international competitors from the US, the Netherlands and Ireland.

The Prince Albert Trophy 

Given the success of the fledgling Students Coxed Fours event the stewards agreed to accept and to fund a permanent trophy to be awarded to the winners of the event, two years after its start. The trophy was designed and created by Hector Miller and was presented by Imperial College London - the 2004 winners. It is named after Prince Albert who became the first Royal Patron of the Regatta in 1851 and was also closely associated with the origins of Imperial College. The Cup was accepted by the Regatta in the presence of H.M. The Queen at Buckingham Palace in June 2006. As with other competitions at the Royal Regatta the names of the winning crew are inscribed on the trophy.

Winners

Records

References

Events at Henley Royal Regatta
Rowing trophies and awards